In Greek and Roman legendary history, Orithyia, "woman raging in the mountains", was the daughter of Marpesia.

History 
Upon the death of her mother, Orithyia became the new queen of the Amazons. She co-ruled with Antiope, who some authorities say was her sister.  She was famous for her perpetual virginity. Her war techniques were outstanding and brought much honor to the Amazon empire.

According to Justinus's Epitome of Trogus Pompeius' History of the World, Orithyia was one of the key figures in the story of Hercules' quest for the girdle of the Amazon queen. Pompeius Trogus' version of this story was as follows. Eurystheus, king of Mycenae, thought it would be nearly impossible to capture Orithyia's royal girdle in war (according to most other versions, the girdle belonged to Hippolyte), so he passed this duty onto Hercules, his debtor, as his ninth labor. Hercules then gathered together nine warships and occupied the shores of the Amazons while Orithyia was away. Because of the confusion and the carelessness of the Amazons their numbers were greatly reduced. Hercules was easily able then to capture Melanippe and Hippolyte, Antiope's sisters. Hercules returned Melanippe after getting the queen's girdle, however Hippolyte was taken away by Theseus, king of Athens, as his share of the spoil. Orithyia then led the Attic War to free Hippolyte and take revenge for the defeat of Antiope. She asked Sagillus, the Scythian king, for assistance, and he sent his son Panasagoras with a body of cavalry to her aid. However, some disagreement occurred between the allies, and the Scythians left the battlefield. The Amazons were eventually defeated, but managed to escape to their allies' camp and, under their protection, returned home safely

The following is an alternative version of what took place after Hercules' invasion. Some Thrakian and Scythian slaves were kept in Athens for personally guarding the Athenian king, and Orithyia took advantage of this opportunity to avenge her sister's defeat. She summoned the Scythian allies along with the Thrakian allies and sent two sets of diplomatic envoys to negotiate. One set was to contact the slave leaders to gain their assistance for freedom in return and another set to ensure Lakonia did not assist Athens. Orithyia then triumphantly marched her army across the Kimmerian Bosporus over the Danube River and through the area of Thrake. Orithya besieged Athens, however in the battle Antiope was killed. Orithyia built a tomb for Antiope after completing a treaty with the Athenians. In the battles Orithya had received serious injuries and ultimately died of these. She was buried on route home by her army. Orithyia's successor was Penthesilea.

In Giovanni Boccaccio's Famous Women, a chapter is dedicated to Orithyia and Antiope.

Notes

See also
Hercules and the Amazon Women
Penthesilea
Hippolyta
Otrera

References

Primary sources 
Orosius Historiae adversus paganos I.15.7-9
Justinus Epitoma Historiarum philippicarum Pompei Trogi II.4.17-30

Secondary sources 
Watson, John Selby Justin, Cornelius Nepos, and Eutropius: Literally Translated, pp 21–22, 547; Published 1853 H. G. Bohn,  original in the New York Public Library
Williams, Henry Smith The Historians' History of the World: A Comprehensive Narrative of the Rise, v.2, p. 440-441; Published 1904 The Outlook Company, New York Public Library

Queens of the Amazons
Children of Ares